Monte Cassino Girls High School is a Catholic boarding-school 7km south-east of Macheke in the Mashonaland East province of Zimbabwe. The school was built between two mountain ranges with its entrance coming in from the west side after crossing the Mucheke River.

The school was founded as part of the Catholic Mission at Monte Cassino in 1902. Like many mission schools in Zimbabwe, Monte Cassino was one of the first schools which provided education to Black African people. In the 1960s, the school's administration was taken over by the Precious Blood Sisters, most of whom were from Germany.

There are four houses at the school: Nightingale, Boeckenhoff, Pfanner and Kizito.

Notable alumnae
 Joana Mamombe, politician
 Valerie Tagwira, writer and obstetrician-gynecologist

References

External links
 "Examination Centres Registered for HEXCO Courses", Higher Education Examination Council (HEXCO), Ministry of Higher and Tertiary Education Zimbabwe.

Boarding schools in Zimbabwe
Educational institutions established in 1902
Girls' schools in Zimbabwe
Girls' high schools in Zimbabwe
Catholic secondary schools in Zimbabwe
High schools in Zimbabwe
Catholic boarding schools
Education in Mashonaland East Province
Girls boarding schools
1902 establishments in the British Empire